(or Singapore) was launched in 1826 at St Martin's, New Brunswick. Her registry was transferred to London.

She entered Lloyd's Register (LR).

She then proceeded to sail between England and Canada. 

In 1813 the British East India Company (EIC) had lost its monopoly on the trade between India and Britain. British ships were then free to sail to India or the Indian Ocean under a licence from the EIC.

She was on a voyage from Mauritius to Glasgow when she was driven ashore in Table Bay on 1 September 1830 and was wrecked.

Citations

References
 

1826 ships
Age of Sail merchant ships of England
Maritime incidents in September 1830